The Istituto Luce (translation: "Light Institute", with Luce being the acronym for "L’Unione Cinematografica Educativa", i.e. "The Educational Film Union") was an Italian film corporation, created in 1924 during the Fascist era. The Institute, based in Rome, was  involved in the production and distribution of films and documentaries intended for being screened in cinemas. Famous for having been a powerful propaganda tool of the fascist regime, it is considered as the oldest public institution devoted to production and distribution of cinematographic materials for didactic and informative purposes in the world.

History and profile 

Istituto Luce was founded in 1924 as a stock company, and then Benito Mussolini through the Royal Decree Law no. 1985 of 5 November 1925 ruled it as non-profit "moral institution" governed by public law.  

In July 1925 the Presidency of the Council of Ministers sent out a circular to the Ministers of Interior, Education, Economy and Colonies asking them to use exclusively Istituto Luce for their educational and propaganda purposes.  

In 1927 it created the newsreel , intended to be screened compulsorily in all Italian cinemas before the screening of their films.

In 1936 the Institute ceased to depend directly on the prime minister and went under the MinCulPop.

After the war the company continued to engage in production of numerous documentaries and films (directed, among others, by Pupi Avati, Marco Bellocchio, Claude Chabrol, Liliana Cavani, Mario Monicelli, Ermanno Olmi, and Ettore Scola). In 2009 the company was merged with Cinecittà Holding SpA, setting up a joint stock company: Cinecittà Luce SpA, which in 2011 was renamed Istituto Luce Cinecittà. 

As of July 2012, a large collection of movies (about 30,000) was made available to the public through a YouTube channel, thanks to an agreement with Google.

Notes

Further reading
  
     Mino Argentieri. L'occhio del regime. Informazione e propaganda nel cinema del fascismo. Vallecchi, 1979.
     Amedeo Benedetti. "Istituto Luce" in Il Cinema documentato. Cineteche, Musei del Cinema e Biblioteche cinematografiche in Italia, Genova, Cineteca D.W. Griffith, 2002, pp. 130–135.
     Amedeo Benedetti. "L'Istituto Luce di Roma". Insegnare, n. 5, May 2005. pp. 47–48.
     Federico Caprotti. "Information management and fascist identity: newsreels in fascist Italy". Media History 11(3): 177–191, 2005.
     E.A. Cicchino. Il Duce attraverso il Luce. Mursia. . 
     Stefano Mannucci. Luce sulla guerra. La fotografia di guerra tra propaganda e realtà. Italia 1940–45. Nuova Arnica Editrice, 2007.
     Alessandro Sardi. Cinque anni di vita dell'Istituto Nazionale L.U.C.E.. Istituto Nazionale Luce, 1929.
     Felix Monguilot Benzal. "L’Istituto Luce nella guerra civile spagnola". Cinemasessanta, n.301. Città del Sole Edizioni, July – September 2009. pp. 58 – 69.

External links
 
Official website
Official YouTube Channel
Historical Archive

1924 establishments in Italy
Film production companies of Italy
Film distributors of Italy
Mass media companies established in 1924
Italian Fascism